Rodney Wood Henderson (born March 11, 1971) is an American former Major League Baseball (MLB) pitcher who played for the Montreal Expos in 1994 and the Milwaukee Brewers in 1998, and who is currently a scout for the Pittsburgh Pirates.

Playing career
Henderson attended Glasgow High School in Glasgow, Kentucky, and the University of Kentucky, where he pitched for the Kentucky Wildcats baseball team. In 1991, he played collegiate summer baseball with the Chatham A's of the Cape Cod Baseball League.

Henderson was drafted by the Montreal Expos in the second round of the 1992 Major League Baseball Draft. He pitched for the Montreal Expos in 1994, and the Milwaukee Brewers in 1998. Henderson finished his playing career with the Sacramento River Cats, the AAA affiliate of the Oakland Athletics, in 2001.

Scouting career
Henderson joined the New York Mets scouting department in October of 2001, and currently holds the title of Professional Evaluation Team Leader with the Pittsburgh Pirates.

References

External links
, or Retrosheet
Pura Pelota (Venezuelan Winter League) 

1971 births
Living people
American expatriate baseball players in Canada
Baseball players from Kentucky
Binghamton Mets players
Chatham Anglers players
Harrisburg Senators players
Jamestown Expos players
Kentucky Wildcats baseball players
Long Island Ducks players
Louisville Redbirds players
Louisville RiverBats players
Major League Baseball pitchers
Milwaukee Brewers players
Montreal Expos players
Ottawa Lynx players
People from Greensburg, Kentucky
Pittsburgh Pirates scouts
Sacramento River Cats players
Tacoma Rainiers players
Tiburones de La Guaira players
American expatriate baseball players in Venezuela
University of Kentucky alumni 
West Palm Beach Expos players